Maryland Heights, Missouri is the name of a city in St. Louis County, Missouri.

Maryland Heights may also refer to:
 Maryland Heights Expressway (Missouri Route 141), in the St. Louis, Missouri, metropolitan area
 Maryland Heights Township, St. Louis County, Missouri
 The southern end of Elk Ridge in Maryland, part of Harpers Ferry National Historical Park

See also
 The Heights School (Maryland), a private elementary school in Potomac, Maryland
 Marland Heights, West Virginia
 Mayland Heights, Calgary